The Sri Lanka cricket team toured Bangladesh in January and February 2018 to play two Tests and two Twenty20 International (T20I) matches. Prior to the tour, both teams played in a tri-series, along with Zimbabwe.

In December 2017, Shakib Al Hasan was named as the new captain of Bangladesh's Test squad, replacing Mushfiqur Rahim. However, ahead of the Test series, Shakib suffered a hand injury during the final of the 2017–18 Bangladesh Tri-Nation Series, with Mahmudullah named as captain of Bangladesh for the first Test. It was Mahmudullah's first Test as captain and he became the tenth player to lead Bangladesh in Tests. Mahmudullah also captained Bangladesh for the second Test, as Shakib was still recovering from his injury. Sri Lanka won the Test series 1–0, after the first match was drawn.

Shakib Al Hasan was also ruled out of the T20I series, with Mahmudullah once again named as captain in his place. Sri Lanka won the T20I series 2–0.

Squads

Sunzamul Islam and Tanbir Hayder were added to Bangladesh's squad for the first Test following the news of Shakib Al Hasan's injury. Abdur Razzak was also added to Bangladesh's Test squad as cover for Shakib Al Hasan. Sri Lanka's Angelo Mathews missed the first Test due to injury and was later ruled out of the rest of the tour. Sabbir Rahman was added to Bangladesh's squad ahead of the second Test, with Sunzamul Islam and Rubel Hossain both being dropped.

Ahead of the T20I series, Shakib Al Hasan's finger injury had not yet healed and he said he would be unlikely to play in the matches, despite being named as the captain of Bangladesh's T20I squad. Shakib was ruled out of the first T20I due to his injury and Nazmul Islam was added to Bangladesh's squad as his replacement. Mohammad Mithun was added to Bangladesh's squad as cover for Tamim Iqbal and Mushfiqur Rahim.

Kusal Perera was ruled out of Sri Lanka's T20I squad due to injury and was replaced by Kusal Mendis. Asela Gunaratne was also ruled out of Sri Lanka's T20I squad due to injury.

Test series

1st Test

2nd Test

T20I series

1st T20I

2nd T20I

Notes

References

External links
 Series home

2018 in Sri Lankan cricket
2018 in Bangladeshi cricket
International cricket competitions in 2017–18
Sri Lankan cricket tours of Bangladesh